Temple Emanu-El is a Reform Jewish congregation in Birmingham, Alabama.

History
The community that would become Temple Emanu-El first held Rosh Hashana and Yom Kippur celebrations in 1881. Before the synagogue was built, the community met at the Cumberland Presbyterian Church for the public worship services. Land for the synagogue was purchased in 1884, and construction began in 1886. The building, located on the southeast corner of 5th Avenue North and 17th Street, was inaugurated on January 24, 1889. The temple's founding president and (lay) rabbi was businessman, poet, and humanitarian Samuel Ullman (1840-1924).

Rabbi Morris Newfield, originally from Hungary, led the congregation for 45 years, from 1895 to 1940. The congregation moved to a new sanctuary, at 2100 Highland Avenue South, in 1912.

Rabbi Milton Grafman, one of the signers of "A Call for Unity", led the congregation from 1941 to 1975.

Jonathan Miller was the congregation's rabbi from winter 1991 to summer 2017.

Adam Wright became the congregation's rabbi in July 2019.

See also
List of synagogues in the United States

References

External links

Jews and Judaism in Appalachia
Religious organizations established in 1881
Reform synagogues in Alabama
Religious buildings and structures in Birmingham, Alabama
1881 establishments in Alabama
Synagogues completed in 1889
Synagogues completed in 1912